A fifth wheel is a coupling that provides a link between the trailer and a truck (or a tractor unit). 

Fifth wheel may also refer to:

 Fifth-wheel trailer, a type of travel trailer that is a variant of the tractor-trailer version
 Fifth wheel (Brooks Walker), an invention designed to aid parking cars
 Fifth Wheel Truck Stops, a truck stop chain across Southern Ontario, Canada
 The 5th Wheel, an American reality dating show 
 The Fifth Wheel (film), a 2013 comedy-drama film
 "Fifth Wheel", a song by Avail from their 1998 album Over the James
 An idiom meaning "an extra and unnecessary person or thing"